LAstrolabe is a French icebreaker that is used to bring personnel and supplies to the Dumont d'Urville Station in Antarctica. The vessel, built by Chantiers Piriou and delivered in September 2017, replaced the 1986-built vessel of the same name.

Development and construction 

In June 2015, the Ministry of Overseas France awarded the construction of a 50 million Euro polar logistics vessel to the Chantiers Piriou from Concarneau in Brittany. The vessel, based on a concept developed by French naval architecture company Marine Assistance, combines the functions of the two existing French ships it replaced: the 1966-built patrol vessel L'Albatros and the 1986-built icebreaker L'Astrolabe. The new vessel is owned and operated by the French Southern and Antarctic Lands (TAAF) administration, the French Polar Institute Paul-Émile Victor (IPEV) and the French Navy.

Since Chantiers Piriou had no experience of building an ice-going vessel, the French shipyard joined forces with the Finnish engineering company Aker Arctic in order to be able to bid against foreign shipyards such as the German Nordic Yards. Later, Aker Arctic was also chosen to carry out basic design and ice model testing for the vessel.

Since the Chantiers Piriou shipyard was fully booked with ship orders from the French Navy, the construction of the hull was subcontracted to a Polish shipyard. The production of the vessel began on 16 December at CRIST in Gdynia, Poland. On 22 December 2016, approximately one year later, the vessel was floated out from the dry dock. The unfinished vessel was then towed to France for final outfitting. The ship, which was given the name LAstrolabe after her predecessor on 12 July, was delivered in September 2017.

Career 
LAstrolabe was deployed in the Indian Ocean in 2017, and carried out her first resupply mission to the Dumont d'Urville Station in Adélie Land, Antarctica, in 2018.

In November 2019, a major defect in the ship's propeller forced LAstrolabe to cancel the resupply mission to France's Antarctic research stations. French expeditioners, cargo and supplies will instead be carried on the Australian icebreaker Aurora Australis which was made available by the Australian Antarctic Division.

In spring 2021 the ship engaged in a surveillance and fisheries patrol mission around the Scattered Islands and Mayotte to monitor the French Exclusive Economic Zones (EEZs).

Most recently in September 2021 the ship docked at the BAE Systems Shipyard near Fremantle, Western Australia for some out of water repairs.

Design 
The vessel can carry 1,200tons of cargo and has accommodation for up to 60 personnel, which includes the crew of the vessel. She can also accommodate a helicopter belowdecks.

The vessel is powered by four  Wärtsilä 8L20 medium-speed diesel engines driving two stainless steel controllable pitch propellers. She is also fitted with selective catalytic reduction units to reduce NOx emissions and comply with IMO Tier III emission regulations.

LAstrolabe is classified by Bureau Veritas.

References 

2016 ships
Icebreakers of France
Research vessels of France